Mattoral (: The Other) is a 1988 Indian Malayalam-language family drama film directed by K. G. George from a story by C. V. Balakrishnan, who co-wrote the screenplay with George. It features Mammootty, Karamana Janardanan Nair, Seema and Urvashi  in the lead roles. The plot focuses the life of two couples' Silent treatment and the sudden desertion of a housewife.

M. B. Sreenivasan composed the film's score, while Ramachandra Babu served as the cinematographer. The film was shot in Thiruvananthapuram.

Plot
Kaimal, a rude and egotistical bureaucrat, and Susheela, a housewife, are leading an unhappy married life, with two children. Meanwhile, their family friends Balan and Veni, a newly married couple, seem to lead a different and liberal life.

Suddenly one evening, Susheela disappears from the house, only to identify later that she eloped with a car mechanic Giri and is at his home. Kaimal, though devastated, goes ahead with his insipid routine, but is hurt by many of his colleagues. Balan, the family friend, throughout supports Kaimal to get relief. Balan moves to get an answer for the mystery of this unprecedented desertion, while also trying to bring back Susheela, who was still having a discontented life with Giri, to Kaimal's life. It follows some dramatic turns portraying the inner conflict of the characters.

Cast
 Mammootty as Balan
 Karamana Janardanan Nair as Kaimal
 Seema as Susheela
 Urvashi as Veni
 Murali as Mahesh
 Jagathi Sreekumar as Thomas
 Ebin as Giri
 Valsala Menon
 Leela Panicker
 Rajamma
 Latha Thomas
 Suraj
 Rajan Mannarakkayam
 L. Narayanan
 Kala

Production
Principal photography took place in Thiruvananthapuram, with the first shot taken at a car workshop in Thakarapparambu. Mammootty read the script from writer C. V. Balakrishnan only after the initial filming was completed. A scene wherein Mammootty's character hums a song was changed to him singing, after a suggestion by director John Abraham, who while his visit to the film's set sang "Alappuzhakkaran Kesavanaasante", a Kuttanad folk song from there, which was included in the scene as Mammootty singing.

The film is based on a story by author C. V. Balakrishnan, who co-wrote the script, in his film debut. K. G. George had once said, "it was C. V. Balakrishnan's film".

Critical response
In a 2016 article for The Hindu, film critic C. S. Venkiteswaran described the film as "one of the most chilling portrayals of middle class life and the void that men are despite their progressive, civic appearances." In a 2018 critical study article of K. G. George's films, Hindu'''s Joseph Anthony observed, "If George's women battle jealous, self-indulgent and exploitative men in his other films, in Mattoral'' they battle a more formidable enemy, the ideal husband — the decent man or the bore."

References

External links
 
 Mattoral at the Malayalam Movie Database

1988 films
1980s Malayalam-language films
1988 drama films
Films directed by K. G. George